Wichian Klanprasert, a Thai police officer, allegedly was killed by Vorayuth Yoovidhya, grandson of billionaire Red Bull co-founder Chaleo Yoovidhya, in a hit-and-run incident in Bangkok, Thailand, on 3 September 2012.

Vorayuth, then 27, was charged with speeding, fleeing the scene of an accident, and reckless driving causing death, but has never been arrested. The statute of limitations on the speeding charge expired in September 2013, and on the fleeing the scene of an accident charge in September 2017. All charges against him were dropped in July 2020.

The case is widely seen as an example of how the affluent in Thai society are able to escape the criminal justice system.

2012 hit-and-run
Wichian, a Thai police senior sergeant-major, was riding a motorcycle when he was hit by a speeding Ferrari which dragged his body along the road for over  before it fled the scene.

The Ferrari was later found to have been driven by Vorayuth, a grandson of billionaire Red Bull co-founder Chaleo Yoovidhya. Vorayuth was found to have illegal drugs (cocaine) and alcohol in his system. Vorayuth's lawyer later claimed that Vorayuth's high blood alcohol levels were due to his drinking at home, due to stress following the accident and that he had left the scene to inform his family of what had happened. Although the police reportedly have no official record of this, Vorayuth asserted that the cocaine was found in his system due to medicine administered during dental work. Vorayuth initially claimed that Suwet Hom-ubol, Vorayuth's aide and chauffeur, had been behind the wheel during the incident, but later admitted to driving the car himself. Suwet would later be charged with making false statements to the police. An investigating police officer, Police Lieutenant Colonel Pannaphol Nammueng, allegedly urged Suwet to pretend to be the Ferrari driver in the fatal hit-and-run. The case has caused continuing outrage in Thailand.

Subsequent investigation
Despite assurances by then-Police Commissioner Comronwit Toopgrajank that the case would be taken seriously, as of April 2017 Vorayuth had yet to be indicted, as his lawyers had repeatedly postponed summons by the Attorney-General, claiming illness, overseas business and unfair treatment, and the statute of limitations expired for several charges.

In April 2017, Vorayuth failed for the eighth time to appear in court to answer the charges against him, citing work commitments.

On 28 April 2017 the criminal court approved an arrest warrant for Vorayuth, however he had already fled to Singapore, where he abandoned his private jet. Interpol confirmed that Vorayuth left Singapore on 27 April. Thai police requested that his Thai passport be cancelled and this was done in early May 2017.

On 28 August 2017 Interpol, at the request of the Thai police, issued a red notice for the arrest of Vorayuth.

Dismissal of charges
On 24 July 2020, Thai police confirmed that all charges against Vorayuth had been dropped on instructions from the Thai Attorney General, but indicated that case could be reopened if new evidence was discovered. The Attorney General did not elaborate or provide any explanation for dropping the case. Deputy police spokesman Kissana Phathanacharoen denied that the Yoovidhya family's wealth had played any part in the decision to drop the charges. News of this development led to significant public outcry and criticism from Thai academics, and a movement to boycott Red Bull products, including trending Twitter hashtags like #BossYoovidhya.

A leaked copy of the prosecutor's report revealed that a new review conducted in 2017 concluded that the Ferrari's speed was only 76.17 km/h, under the road's 80 km/h speed limit, and two eyewitnesses testified that Wichian had been driving erratically. The report stated that, since Vorayuth's actions were not negligent and Wichian's driving had been a contributory factor in his own death, there was no basis for a Section 291 criminal charge for negligence leading to death.

On 27 July 2020, Thai police announced that Police General Jakthip Chaijinda had launched an internal investigation into irregularities with this case. Klunprasert's surviving brother expressed his dismay at the outcome, indicating frustration with the sense of impunity in Thailand's criminal justice system for wealthy and well-connected Thais.

See also
 Corruption in Thailand

References

Corruption in Thailand
Crime in Thailand
September 2012 events in Thailand
2012 crimes in Thailand